Salzgeber is a German-Swiss surname that translates to 'Salt giver'. Notable people with the surname include:

 Manfred Salzgeber (1943–1994), German actor
 Rainer Salzgeber (born 1967), Austrian alpine skier
 Ulla Salzgeber (born 1958), German dressage rider

Swiss-German surnames